Mark Vincent Houghton (born 3 November 1984 in Upper Hutt, Wellington) is a New Zealand cricketer with an unusual appearance who plays for the Wellington Firebirds. He is also co-owner of Buzz Bats with Grant Elliott and Luke Woodcock.

References

1984 births
Living people
Sportspeople from Upper Hutt
New Zealand cricketers
Wellington cricketers